The 1978 All-Pacific-10 Conference football team consists of American football players chosen by various organizations for All-Pacific-10 Conference teams for the 1978 NCAA Division I-A football season.

Offensive selections

Quarterback
 Jack Thompson, Washington State (1st)

Running backs
 Theotis Brown, UCLA (1st)
 Darrin Nelson, Stanford (1st)
 Charles White, USC (1st)

Wide receivers
 Ken Margerum, Stanford (1st)
 Kevin Williams, USC (1st)

Tight end
 Ron Beyer, Arizona (1st)

Tackles
 Jeff Toews, Washington (1st)
 Anthony Muñoz, USC (1st)

Guards
 Pat Howell, USC (1st)
 Brad Budde, USC (1st)

Center
 Mark Chandless, Washington State (1st)

Defensive selections

Linemen
 Rick Dimler, USC (1st)
 Al Harris, Arizona State (1st)
 Doug Martin, Washington (1st)
 Manu Tuiasosopo, UCLA (1st) [nose guard]

Linebackers
 Gordy Ceresino, Stanford
 Michael Jackson, Washington (1st)
 Dennis Johnson, USC (1st)
 Jerry Robinson, UCLA (1st)

Defensive backs
 Kim Anderson, Arizona State (1st)
 Kenny Easley, UCLA (1st)
 Nesby Glasgow, Washington (1st)
 Kyle Heinrich, Washington (1st)

Special teams

Placekicker
 Peter Boermeester, UCLA (1st)

Punter
 Marty King, USC (1st)

Key

See also
1978 College Football All-America Team

References

All-Pacific-10 Conference Football Team
All-Pac-12 Conference football teams